Andrei Grigoraș (born 15 May 1989 ), is a Romanian futsal player who plays for Sfântu Gheorghe and the Romanian national futsal team.

References

External links
UEFA profile

1989 births
Living people
Futsal goalkeepers
Romanian men's futsal players